Saionji Kisshi (西園寺 姞子; 1225 – 20 October 1292) was Empress of Japan as the consort of Emperor Go-Saga. She was also known as Ōmiya-in (大宮院), her imperial title (ingō), and as Fujiwara no Kisshi (藤原 姞子), by her original clan name (honsei).

Life 
She was the first daughter of Saionji Saneuji and Shijō Sadako.

Upon Emperor Go-Saga's passing, she ordained as a Buddhist nun and received the Dharma name Henchikaku (遍智覚).

Family 
Issue:

Fourth son: Imperial Prince Hisahito (久仁親王) (Emperor Go-Fukakusa)
First daughter: Imperial Princess Osako (綜子内親王)
Seventh son: Imperial Prince Tsunehito (恒仁親王) (Emperor Kameyama)
Eleventh son: Imperial Prince Masataka (雅尊親王)
Thirteenth son: Imperial Prince Sadayoshi (貞良親王)

Notes

Fujiwara clan
Japanese empresses
Japanese Buddhist nuns
13th-century Buddhist nuns
1225 births
1292 deaths